Hemdee Kiwanuka (born August 31, 1975) is a Ugandan Film producer.  He has directed and produced several movies since 2016, such as The Brothers Grimsby (2016), Army of One (2020) and Jimmy Kimmel Live! (2003).

Early life 
Hemdee Kiwanuka was born in 1975 in Kampala, Uganda, to Halima Namakula. In 1987, Hemdee relocated to the United States.

Career 
Hemdee began his entertainment career as a Hip hop artist in the 90s.  In 2013, Kiwanuka produced his first reality Television Show “Fame In The Family” which aired on E! Network.

In 2018, Hemdee Kiwanuka premiered his first film The Dark Within. In the same year, Hemdee and GRB Studios signed a multiyear licensing and distribution deal with Black TV.

Filmography

Television

Film

Personal life 
In 2007, Hemdee Kiwanuka is in relationship with Sheila Mulindwa.  In 2018, he was invited to be part of the 14th Annual LA FEMME International Film Festival Awards Ceremony Honoring Rachel Winter and Jaina Lee Ortiz.

References

External links
HemDee Kiwanuka: Movies, TV, and Bio
HemDee Kiwanuka - Rotten Tomatoes
HemDee Kiwanuka
HemDee Kiwanuka (HemDee Kiwanuka) - Фильмы и сериалы
Hollywood stars wooed to invest in Uganda’s movie industry

Living people
Ugandan film directors
Ugandan film producers
1975 births
People from Kampala
Ganda people
Silent film directors
Ugandan television personalities
Ugandan screenwriters